Herringbone may refer to:

Herring-Bone (card game), a game of patience
Herringbone (cloth), a woven pattern of tweed or twill cloth
Herringbone (formation), a type of military formation
Herringbone (horse) (1940–1961), a Thoroughbred racehorse
Herringbone cross-stratification, a sedimentary structure in geology that is formed from back-and-forth tidal water flow
Herringbone gear, a type of gear
Herringbone pattern, a pattern of floor tiling or paving
Herringbone seating, a pattern of airliner seating
A bonding pattern of brickwork, also known as opus spicatum
Herringbone stitch
A type of braided hairstyle, which is also known as a fishtail braid
A distortion pattern from deinterlacing video called mouse teeth
A method of counting used with the unary numeral system
A technique of moving one's skis while cross-country skiing
Herringbone milking shed
Herringbone, another name for the medical condition scintillating scotoma
"Herringbone", a song by Department of Eagles from In Ear Park, 2008

See also
Herring, the fish whose bones are the namesake of the "herringbone" pattern